Kimberly Akimbo is a 2021 musical with music by Jeanine Tesori, and lyrics and book by David Lindsay-Abaire. It is based on Lindsay-Abaire's 2001 comedy of the same name.

The show tells the story of a lonely teenage girl, Kimberly Levaco, who suffers from a condition similar to progeria that causes her to age rapidly, thereby giving her the appearance of an elderly woman, and how, according to Playbill, "[f]orced to maneuver family secrets, borderline personalities, and possible felony charges, Kim is determined to find happiness in a world where not even time is on her side."

The show's premiere production opened Off-Broadway on December 8, 2021, at the Linda Gross Theater in Manhattan; it was critically acclaimed, and won Best Musical prizes at the Drama Desk, Lucille Lortel, and Outer Critics Circle Awards. The show then moved to Broadway, opening at the Booth Theatre on November 12, 2022 (with previews beginning on October 12).

Background 
Playwright David Lindsay-Abaire's comedy Kimberly Akimbo made its premiere in 2001, at the South Coast Repertory in Costa Mesa, California; it eventually moved Off-Broadway in 2003, at the Manhattan Theatre Club, in a production featuring Marylouise Burke, John Gallagher, Jr., and Ana Gasteyer.

Lindsay-Abaire's other plays include Fuddy Meers (1999), Good People (2011), and Rabbit Hole (2006), for which he won the 2007 Pulitzer Prize for Drama. Jeanine Tesori has written the music for stage musicals such as Thoroughly Modern Millie (2000), Caroline, or Change (2003), Shrek the Musical (2008), and Fun Home (2013); she has also been twice nominated for the Pulitzer Prize for Drama, for Fun Home and Soft Power (2018). Lindsay-Abaire and Tesori had previously worked together on Shrek the Musical.

Synopsis

Act l 
At an ice skating rink named "Skater Planet" in Bergen County, New Jersey, six teenagers–Kimberly Levaco, Seth Weetis, Martin Doaty, Aaron Puckett, Teresa Benton, and Delia McDaniels–express their frustrations. Kim is the new girl in town, with a disease that makes her age four and a half times as fast as normal. She wants to go to Six Flags Great Adventure. Seth feels like a misfit, and works at the rink. The four others are all pining for another member of their friend group unrequitedly (Martin for Aaron, Aaron for Delia, Delia for Teresa, and Teresa for Martin). They all feel as if they don't fit in, and express their desire to "be seen" ("Skater Planet"). Kim is waiting for her father, Buddy, at 10:30, when he said that he would pick her up at 7:00. The rink closed at 8:00. He arrives, drunk, and Kimberly gives him a thermos filled with coffee to sober up. Seth comes back to the rink for his tuba, which he had left inside. He asks Kim to be his partner for an upcoming biology project, and says that they could do it about her disease. Buddy retorts and says that Kimberly is researching glaucoma, and insults Seth behind his back. Buddy tells Kimberly to tell her mother, Pattie, that they were late due to car troubles. At the Levaco's home, Pattie, pregnant and with casts on both arms, creates a video for her yet-to-be-born baby ("Hello, Darling"). When Buddy and Kim arrive home, Pattie chastises Buddy for their lateness and his drunkenness, which leads to an argument were both parents end up having to give quarters to the family "swear jar". Buddy suggests the idea that if they save up enough in the swear jar, they could go on a road trip, which Pattie quickly shoots down. It is also established that the family is trying to keep secret the fact that they're from Lodi, New Jersey. In her room, Kimberly writes a letter to the "Make A Wish Foundation". She requests a treehouse, after going back and forth between an array of wishes ("Make A Wish").

At school, Martin, Aaron, Delia, and Teresa, make plans for a Dreamgirls mashup for their school show choir, one that will compete with their rival, West Orange's Evita mashup. They reaffirm their problems with unrequited love ("Skater Planet (reprise #1)"). The group then plans to get classic show choir outfits (blue dresses for the girls and turquoise suits for the boys). Kimberly agrees to be Seth's partner for the biology project, and to use her disease as their topic. Delia invites Teresa to Skater Planet, but Teresa wants to invite Martin. This results in all four members of the friend group agreeing to go to Skater Planet, after Martin invites Aaron. In the library, while studying for their project, Seth creates an anagram of Kim's name. She realizes that she likes him ("Anagram"). Debra, Kim's criminal aunt, shows up and makes crude jokes. She reveals that she has been sleeping in the school library, waiting to find Kimberly. The Levaco family moved from Lodi in a manner that made it difficult for Debra to find them, which was intentional. Debra tells Kim about an exciting new opportunity to make a lot of money, and that it is only "slightly illegal". Debra also tries to convince Martin, Aaron, Delia, and Teresa to help out ("Better"). Kim agrees, but only if she gets a say in the plan, and only if Debra agrees that nobody will get hurt. Debra is ecstatic, and tells Kimberly to leave the window and door unlocked at her house.

Around midnight, at the house, Kim goes to unlock the door, but is caught by Pattie, who is awake because of the baby's kicking. Kimberly distracts her, as Debra sneaks in the window. Kim tells her mother that she reminds her of Medea. However, despite Kim's distraction efforts, Pattie catches Debra. Ignoring Pattie's protests, Debra comes into the house, and drags a mailbox into the basement. Pattie reflects on and laments her situation, before singing a lullaby that she used to sing for Kim to the new baby ("Hello, Darling (reprise)/Father Time"). At this point, it is Kim's sixteenth birthday. The life expectancy of one with her disease is sixteen years old. The next morning, Buddy is driving Kim and Seth to school, but embarrasses Kim by yelling at Seth for supposedly wanting to "get in her [Kimberly's] pants". He also throws Seth's muffin out of the car window ("Happy For Her"). Kimberly yells at her father, and tells him that she hopes he drives the car off the road and crashes into a tree, then dies. Later, at school, Seth tells Kim that if she wanted him to kiss her, he'd do it. He also invites Kim to come to Skater Planet that night, which she agrees to. Kim reflects on her feelings for Seth ("Anagram (reprise)"). That night, at Skater Planet, Seth gives Kimberly a present of a book of anagrams. Pattie, Debra, and Buddy all show up as well, having been invited by Seth, who reveals to Kim that this is a surprise birthday party. Debra gifts Kim an extremely large pinecone, while Buddy and Pattie both promise to, respectively, stop drinking and be a better mother as their presents. Martin, Aaron, Delia, and Teresa arrive, also having been invited to the party. Delia informs the group that they won't be able to get their costumes, because the show choir has run out of money. Hearing this, Debra ropes them into her plan once more. Everybody hopes for the future ("This Time").

Act II 
In Kim’s basement, Debra is teaching the six teenagers how to wash a check. It proves too complex for them, with Aaron getting his arm stuck in the mailbox (from which they are retrieving the checks), and Teresa getting a glue trap stuck to her head (which they are using to fish out the checks). However, once Debra compares them unfavorably to West Orange, they complete the task without trouble (“How to Wash a Check”). At the Levaco home, Buddy is trying to distract himself, since he is not drinking, through an exercise plan he and Kim came up with. When Pattie, now with a leg brace from a skating injury at Kimberly’s birthday party, leaves her camera in the room, he makes a video for the baby. He reflects on the future that he lost when Pattie got pregnant with Kim, and tells the baby to “see the world” (“Hello, Baby”). At school, the six teens are in the library, playing UNO, just before their biology class (and their biology presentations). Seth asks about what will happen if they get caught, and all of them think about what the future holds (“Skater Planet (reprise #2)”). In class, the group does their presentations. Aaron and Martin present scurvy, Delia and Teresa present fasciolosis, and Kim and Seth present her disease. During the presentation, Kimberly gets upset, thinking about how getting older is her affliction, but getting older is the rest of the class’s cure (for adolescence). She runs out of the class (“Our Disease”). 

When Kim arrives at home, she finds that Buddy has cooked a meal for everybody, and they sit down for a family dinner. However, resentment soon boils over, and they begin to fight. It is revealed that Buddy paid Debra to go to the Levaco’s old neighbor, Mr. Zwicky’s house to beat him up, because Pattie had sex with him to ensure that this baby wouldn’t have the same ailment as Kim. They fight, until Kimberly collapses to the floor (“The Inevitable Turn”). Three days later, at the hospital, Kim is bedridden and asleep. Debra convinces Buddy and Pattie to leave and go home, so they can sleep and take showers. Before they leave, Pattie tells Kim (who is pretending to sleep) that the Make A Wish Foundation is going to build her a treehouse. Seth shows up, while Debra takes off to find a bedpan and pills. Seth has brought all sorts of things to help Kim feel better, but she just wants to live in a better moment and they decide to leave to participate in the check fraud scheme, which was to be done without them (“Now”). 

Debra reminds the group of their plan (“How to Wash a Check (reprise)”). She also reveals the kid’s crushes on one another. Kim emerges from the back room disguised as a grandma, which is a part of the plan. She demands that Martin, Aaron, Delia, Teresa, and Seth don’t come along, but Seth insists (he is also the one driving). They go. Later, Kim comes home with a bag of the money and tells her parents that they can finally go on their road trip, and to start packing. She then goes into her room, and sees that they have replaced her bed with a crib for the new baby. They fight, and she tells her parents to give up who they wanted her to be before she dies (“Before I Go”). She writes a new letter to Make A Wish, telling them thank you for the treehouse, but that she doesn’t need it, because she is going to see the world (“Make A Wish (reprise)”). Kimberly and Seth are Buddy’s car, at Six Flags Great Adventure. They are on a road trip, with the camera and their portion of the money–as well as Debra’s money, which they stole. Kim makes a video for her sister, and asks Seth to make sure she gets it. They kiss. Martin, Aaron, Delia, and Teresa (in their show choir outfits), Debra (now working at Costco), Pattie and Buddy (with the new baby), and Kim and Seth tell the audience to “just enjoy the ride” (“Great Adventure”).

Productions

Off-Broadway 
Kimberly Akimbo's premiere production ran Off-Broadway from December 8, 2021 to January 15, 2022 (with previews beginning on November 6), at the Linda Gross Theater in Manhattan, produced by the Atlantic Theater Company. Directed by Jessica Stone, its cast included Tony Award-winner Victoria Clark, Tony nominee Steven Boyer, Alli Mauzey, and Justin Cooley. Set design was by David Zinn; costume design was by Sarah Laux; lighting design was by Lap Chi Chu; sound design was by Kai Harada; choreography was by Danny Mefford; and orchestrations were by John Clancy, with additional musical arrangements by Macy Schmidt.

Broadway 
The show then moved to Broadway's Booth Theatre with the same cast, beginning previews on October 12, 2022 with an official opening on November 10, 2022. It was produced by David Stone, the Atlantic Theater Company, James L. Nederlander, LaChanze, John Gore, Patrick Catullo and Aaron Glick. For this production, the entire creative team remained except for Chu's lighting, who was replaced by Jeanette Oi-Suk Yew.

Musical numbers

Broadway
Act I
 "Skater Planet" - Aaron, Delia, Martin, Teresa, Seth, Kimberly
 "Hello, Darling" - Pattie
 "Make a Wish" - Kimberly
 "Skater Planet (reprise #1)" - Aaron, Delia, Martin, Teresa †
 "Anagram" - Kimberly, Seth, Aaron, Delia, Martin, Teresa
 "Better" - Debra, Aaron, Delia, Martin, Teresa
 "Hello, Darling (reprise)/Father Time" - Pattie
 "Happy For Her" - Buddy
 "Anagram (reprise)" - Kimberly †
 "This Time" - Company

Act II
 "How to Wash a Check" - Debra, Kimberly, Seth, Aaron, Delia, Martin, Teresa
 "Good Kid" - Seth
 "Hello, Baby" - Buddy
 "Skater Planet (reprise #2)" - Aaron, Delia, Martin, Teresa, Seth
 "Our Disease" - Kimberly, Seth, Aaron, Delia, Martin, Teresa
 "The Inevitable Turn" - Pattie, Buddy, Debra, Aaron, Delia, Martin, Teresa
 "Now" - Seth, Kimberly
 "How to Wash a Check (reprise)" - Debra, Aaron, Delia, Martin, Teresa
 "Before I Go" - Kimberly, Buddy, Pattie
 "Hello, Sister" - Kimberly, Seth †
 "Great Adventure" - Company

†=Not on the Broadway Cast Album

Cast and characters

Awards and nominations

2021 Off-Broadway production

References 

2021 musicals
Broadway musicals
Off-Broadway musicals
Musicals by David Lindsay-Abaire
Musicals by Jeanine Tesori
Musicals based on plays